Felipe Andrés Villagrán Rivera (born 17 March 1997) is a Chilean footballer who currently plays for Cobreloa as midfielder.

Career
Villagrán started his career at Primera División de Chile club Club Universidad de Chile. In the summer of 2015, he moved to Portugal signing a deal with Alcanenense.

On 1 June 2016, Villagrán signed a one-year deal with Varzim S.C. He made his professional debut on 6 August 2016, coming on as a substitute in a 1–0 away loss with Gil Vicente F.C., a week later, on 13 August  he scored his first goal in a 2–0 win over S.L. Benfica B.

After playing for Coquimbo Unido, he signed with Cobreloa for the 2023 season.

References

External links

1997 births
Living people
Footballers from Santiago
Chilean footballers
Chilean expatriate footballers
Association football midfielders
Liga Portugal 2 players
Chilean Primera División players
Primera B de Chile players
Universidad de Chile footballers
Varzim S.C. players
S.C. Braga B players
Coquimbo Unido footballers
Curicó Unido footballers
Cobreloa footballers
Chilean expatriate sportspeople in Portugal
Expatriate footballers in Portugal